West Hartley was an unincorporated community in eastern Contra Costa County, California. It is now a ghost town. It was a mining town for the nearby coal mines.

It was founded in the late 1880s and named for England's West Hartley coal mine.

References

Former settlements in Contra Costa County, California
Unincorporated communities in California
Ghost towns in California
Ghost towns in the San Francisco Bay Area
Company towns in California
Populated places established in the 1880s